Martin Bangemann (15 November 1934 – 28 June 2022) was a German politician and a leader of the Free Democratic Party (FDP) from 1985 to 1988. He was German Federal Minister of Economics and European Commissioner.

Life and career

Bangemann was born on 15 November 1934 in Wanzleben. He studied law in Tübingen and Munich, and earned a Dr. jur. (not equivalent to J.D., but a PhD in law) in 1962 with a dissertation entitled Bilder und Fiktionen in Recht und Rechtswissenschaft (Imagery and fiction in law and jurisprudence). He qualified as an attorney in 1964. In 1963, he joined the FDP. He worked as a lawyer in Baden-Württemberg.

In 1972, he was elected to the Bundestag and became briefly Secretary General of the FDP.

Bangemann was a member of the European Parliament from 1973 to 1984; from 1976 to 1979 he was vice-chairman, from 1979 to 1984 chairman of the Liberal and Democratic Group. From 1978 to 1979 he was vice-chair of the Committee on Budgets.

Bangemann was the German Federal Minister of Economics from 1984 to 1988. Problems in his tenure were high unemployment and the steel, coal and shipyard crises.

In 1988, Bangemann joined the European Commission. He was Commissioner for the internal market and industrial affairs in the Delors Commission from 1989 to 1995. He was then Commissioner for Industrial affairs, Information & Telecommunications Technologies in the Santer Commission from 1995 to 1999.

As commissioner he led a "high-level group" that drew up the report "Europe and the Global Information Society" in 1994. This document contained recommendations to the European Council on the measures that Europe should take regarding information infrastructure. It became known as the "Bangemann report" and influenced many EU policies.

He then moved from European politics to the board of the Spanish group Telefónica. In addition, Bangemann ran a consulting agency.

He was married and had five children.

Bangemann died from a heart attack at his home in Deux-Sèvres on 28 June 2022 at the age of 87.

References

Citations

General and cited sources

External links
 

|-

|-

1934 births
2022 deaths
Economy ministers of Germany
German European Commissioners
Members of the Bundestag for Baden-Württemberg
MEPs for Germany 1958–1979
Members of the European Parliament for Germany
Knights Commander of the Order of Merit of the Federal Republic of Germany
Grand Crosses of the Order of Prince Henry
Members of the Bundestag for the Free Democratic Party (Germany)
People from Börde (district)